Chionodes manabiensis is a moth in the family Gelechiidae. It is found in Ecuador.

The wingspan is 9–10 mm for males and 9.5-11.9 mm for females.

Etymology
The species name is derived from Manabí, Ecuador, the type locality.

References

Chionodes
Moths described in 2007
Moths of South America